Austin Shaw is a songwriter, singer, producer, and guitarist based out of Santa Cruz, California.   Shaw's debut EP is Love on Both Sides, and was produced by Robert Smith (Defy Records), and features guitarist Robert Saltzman (Paul Simon), drummer Joe Bonadio (Sting), bassist Malcolm Gold and vocalist Clara Lofaro.

Shaw was voted "Best Local Musician" in 2016 by Good Times (newspaper) in Santa Cruz.

Shaw toured with musician David Bromberg in early 2017.

Austin Shaw's sophomore EP, "Felt" has recently been released.  It contains songs that will be on the full-length album by the same name, due out this summer.  "Felt" was recorded at Grand Street Recording Studios, in Brooklyn.

References

External links 
 Austin Shaw Website

Living people
American male guitarists
American male singer-songwriters
American singer-songwriters
Year of birth missing (living people)